Pablo Enrique Ruiz (born December 20, 1998) is an Argentine professional footballer who plays as a midfielder for Major League Soccer side Real Salt Lake.

Club career
On 2 February 2018, Ruíz joined MLS team Real Salt Lake from San Luis in Chile. On 1 November 2020, he signed a contract extension through the end of 2025 MLS season.

International career
He represented Argentina U17 at the 2015 South American Championship. At senior level, he is eligible for both Argentina and Chile.

Personal life
His parents are Argentine and his grandparents are Chilean. Due to his Chilean heritage, he acquired the Chilean nationality by descent before joining San Luis de Quillota at the end of 2016.

References

External links
 

1998 births
Living people
People from Comodoro Rivadavia
Citizens of Chile through descent
Argentine footballers
Argentina youth international footballers
Naturalized citizens of Chile
Chilean footballers
Argentine expatriate footballers
Chilean expatriate footballers
San Luis de Quillota footballers
Real Salt Lake players
Real Monarchs players
Chilean Primera División players
Major League Soccer players
USL Championship players
Austrian Regionalliga players
Expatriate soccer players in the United States
Argentine expatriate sportspeople in the United States
Chilean expatriate sportspeople in the United States
Expatriate footballers in Austria
Argentine expatriate sportspeople in Austria
Chilean expatriate sportspeople in Austria
Argentine sportspeople of Chilean descent
Association football midfielders